William Long (October 3, 1935 – March 19, 2010) was an American coxswain. He competed in the men's eight event at the 1960 Summer Olympics.

References

1935 births
2010 deaths
American male rowers
Olympic rowers of the United States
Rowers at the 1960 Summer Olympics
Sportspeople from Little Rock, Arkansas
Coxswains (rowing)